The ambassador of Japan to Malaysia is the head of the Japanese diplomatic mission in Malaysia. The Japanese embassy is based in Kuala Lumpur, the Malaysian capital. The position has the rank of Ambassador extraordinary and plenipotentiary.

List of ambassadors
Takakazu Kuriyama, mid-1980s
Masahiko Horie, 2007 – 2011
Makio Miyagawa, 2014 – October 2019
Hiroshi Oka, November 2019 – December 2021
Takahashi Katsuhiko, December 2021 – present

See also
Japan–Malaysia relations
List of ambassadors of Malaysia to Japan

References

External links
Embassy website

Ambassadors of Japan to Malaysia
Malaysia
Japan